The Bibbulmun Track is a long-distance walk trail in Western Australia.

It is managed by government agencies, and has a foundation.

It traverses the Darling Range and has inspired reflections about the state of the Western Australian environment by William J. Lines in his book A long walk in the Australian bush.

The name comes from the Bibbulmun, or Noongar people, Indigenous Australians from the Perth area.

History
 The route has been changed twice, partly due to it passing through a significant section of forest that was at risk to change from either forestry, bauxite mining or dieback.

The track was suggested in 1972.  The groups that had suggested and also who were involved in planning with the then Forests Department of Western Australia were:
 Perth Bushwalkers
 Western Walking Club
 Youth Hostels Association
 Scout Association of Australia (W.A. Division)
 The Speleological Research Group of W.A.

The track was first opened in 1979 but the third and final alignment and extension through to Albany was opened in 1998 and retains less than 10% of earlier alignments.

The Bibbulmun Track is a walker-only trail. No wheeled vehicles of any kind are permitted.  It has a parallel long-distance cycling trail – known as the Munda Biddi Trail – that opened all the way to Albany in April 2013. This trail is generally situated to the west of the Bibbulmun Track.

Track sections

The track consists of 58 sections and is marked at regular intervals with triangular signs, most of which have a symbol of the Wagyl. The Wagyl, or Rainbow Serpent, is a snakelike Dreamtime creature that is a common deity in Noongar culture. Each section is approximately one day's walk, except for the northernmost  or so, where the sections consist of half-day walks.  At the end of each section is either a town or a purpose-built campsite.  Each campsite consists of a three-sided shelter with wooden sleeping platforms, a water tank, a pit toilet, picnic tables and cleared tent sites.  In the northern half, most campsites also have a barbecue pit and plate (open fires are banned in the southern section).

The Bibbulmun Track is almost all through state forest, national parks and other reserves, with only a few small sections of farmland.  The first half of the track is through the jarrah forests of the Darling Range.  It then moves through flatter tall karri forests until reaching the coastline near the town of Walpole.  The remainder of the track is through coastal forest and scrub along the south coast, in some sections routed along sandy beaches.

The towns the track passes through are Dwellingup, Collie, Balingup, Pemberton, Northcliffe, Walpole and Denmark.

Highlights of the track include:
 Mundaring Weir
 Monadnocks area and Mount Cooke
 Murray River Valley
 karri forests between Donnelly River and Denmark
 Tingle forest near Walpole
 Coastal scenery along the south coast
 Wildflower displays, birdlife and other Southwest Australian flora and fauna.
 Marine mammals along the south coast such as seals, dolphins and whales

The Bibbulmun Track is managed by the Western Australian Parks and Wildlife Service at the Department of Biodiversity, Conservation and Attractions and The Bibbulmun Track Foundation – an incorporated not-for-profit community-based organisation established to provide support for the department in the management, maintenance and marketing of the track to ensure that it remains a "long-distance walk trail of international significance and quality".  The foundation sells maps and guide books, offers trip planning advice, offers equipment hire and runs courses on camp cooking and navigation.

Most people choose to walk sections of the track for one or a few days at a time.  Hardy walkers who walk the track from beginning to end typically do so in 6 to 8 weeks, although it has been completed in under 12 days. The most popular time to walk the track is during the wildflower season of spring (September – November), going from north to south as the wildflower season starts later in the southern areas. In summer the weather can be very hot and water will be hard to find except in the water tanks at the campsites. Winter can be wet, especially in the southern areas but people walk the track any time from March to December.

Track maps

Awards
 2003 – Finalist  – Major Tourist Attractions – Western Australian Tourism Awards
 2003 – Sport and Recreation Industry Awards
 2004 – Winner – Significant Tourist Attraction – Western Australian Tourism Awards
 2005 – Finalist – Significant Tourist Attraction – Western Australian Tourism Awards
 2006 – Winner – Significant Tourist Attraction – Western Australian Tourism Awards
 2006 – Highly Commended – Significant Tourist Attraction – Australian Tourism Awards

See also 
 Cape to Cape Track
 Long-distance trails
 Munda Biddi Trail
 Backpacking
 Warlu Way

Notes

References
 Forests Department Western Australia (1979) Guide to the Bibbulmun Bushwalking Track Perth, W.A. (Dated August 1979)
 Keating, Annie and Shrimpton, Becky A dream realised – the Bibbulmun Track. Western Australian State Trails Conference : proceedings, 1999, p. 68–76.
 Bonnin, Mylene (editor and compiler) (2004) Bibbulmun Track Accommodation and Services – a walkers guide Bibbulmun Track Foundation and CALM, Perth .W.A.

External links 

 bibbulmuntrack.org.au – Bibbulmun Track Foundation Website 
 bibbulmuntrackmap.com – Online Map of the Bibbulmun Track and GPS files
 aushiker.com – Comprehensive coverage of bushwalking in Western Australia
 Leave No Trace Australia
 trailjournals.com – a personal account of one person's end to end journey on the Bibbulmun Track
 Rough Guide On Bibbulmun Track

Hiking and bushwalking tracks in Western Australia
South West (Western Australia)
Shire of Mundaring
Southwest Australia